Bird River, Tasmania is a short river that drains in the area of South Darwin Peak at the southern end of the West Coast Range, into Macquarie Harbour in Western Tasmania, Australia.

The North Mount Lyell Railway had to cross the river before reaching Pillinger and the harbour in Kelly Basin.

The area around the river and Kelly Basin area is not in the South West World Heritage area, but is on the edge, and has various conservation processes due to the history and ecology of the area.

References

Rivers of Tasmania
Macquarie Harbour